Mutel, Mutel & Cie was a French manufacturer of automobiles and engines, based in Paris, from 1902 until 1906.

Company history 
The Parisian company produced both engines and complete automobiles from  1902 until 1906. Engines were also supplied to other automobile manufacturers.

Vehicles
Vehicles were built on a Malicet et Blin (M.A.B.) chassis, equipped with an in-house engine. One model had a 30 hp four-cylinder engine. In 1902 they offered two, three and four-seat models.

Engine deliveries 
Engines were supplied to: Otto Beckmann, BLM (Breese, Lawrence, Moulton), Boissaye, Celtic (Thornton Engineering), Century Engineering, Couverchel, C.V.R., Dorey, Elswick, L & B, Lacoste & Battmann, Meteor, Morgan, Prunel, Regal, Sage and Wasp.

References

Defunct motor vehicle manufacturers of France
French companies established in 1902